Polonium is a chemical element with the symbol Po and atomic number 84. A rare and highly radioactive metal with no stable isotopes, polonium is a chalcogen and is chemically similar to selenium and tellurium, though its metallic character resembles that of its horizontal neighbors in the periodic table: thallium, lead, and bismuth. Due to the short half-life of all its isotopes, its natural occurrence is limited to tiny traces of the fleeting polonium-210 (with a half-life of 138 days) in uranium ores, as it is the penultimate daughter of natural uranium-238. Though slightly longer-lived isotopes exist, they are much more difficult to produce. Today, polonium is usually produced in milligram quantities by the neutron irradiation of bismuth. Due to its intense radioactivity, which results in the radiolysis of chemical bonds and radioactive self-heating, its chemistry has mostly been investigated on the trace scale only.

Polonium was discovered in July 1898 by Marie Skłodowska-Curie and Pierre Curie, when it was extracted from the uranium ore pitchblende and identified solely by its strong radioactivity: it was the first element to be so discovered. Polonium was named after Marie Curie's homeland of Poland. Polonium has few applications, and those are related to its radioactivity: heaters in space probes, antistatic devices, sources of neutrons and alpha particles, and poison. It is extremely dangerous to humans.

Characteristics

210Po is an alpha emitter that has a half-life of 138.4 days; it decays directly to its stable daughter isotope, 206Pb. A milligram (5 curies) of 210Po emits about as many alpha particles per second as 5 grams of 226Ra, which means it is 5,000 times more radioactive than radium. A few curies (1 curie equals 37 gigabecquerels, 1 Ci = 37 GBq) of 210Po emit a blue glow which is caused by ionisation of the surrounding air.

About one in 100,000 alpha emissions causes an excitation in the nucleus which then results in the emission of a gamma ray with a maximum energy of 803 keV.

Solid state form

Polonium is a radioactive element that exists in two metallic allotropes. The alpha form is the only known example of a simple cubic crystal structure in a single atom basis at STP, with an edge length of 335.2 picometers; the beta form is rhombohedral. The structure of polonium has been characterized by X-ray diffraction and electron diffraction.

More than one hypothesis exists for how polonium does this; one suggestion is that small clusters of polonium atoms are spalled off by the alpha decay.

Chemistry
The chemistry of polonium is similar to that of tellurium, although it also shows some similarities to its neighbor bismuth due to its metallic character. Polonium dissolves readily in dilute acids but is only slightly soluble in alkalis. Polonium solutions are first colored in pink by the Po2+ ions, but then rapidly become yellow because alpha radiation from polonium ionizes the solvent and converts Po2+ into Po4+. As polonium also emits alpha-particles after disintegration so this process is accompanied by bubbling and emission of heat and light by glassware due to the absorbed alpha particles; as a result, polonium solutions are volatile and will evaporate within days unless sealed. At pH about 1, polonium ions are readily hydrolyzed and complexed by acids such as oxalic acid, citric acid, and tartaric acid.

Compounds
Polonium has no common compounds, and almost all of its compounds are synthetically created; more than 50 of those are known. The most stable class of polonium compounds are polonides, which are prepared by direct reaction of two elements. Na2Po has the antifluorite structure, the polonides of Ca, Ba, Hg, Pb and lanthanides form a NaCl lattice, BePo and CdPo have the wurtzite and MgPo the nickel arsenide structure. Most polonides decompose upon heating to about 600 °C, except for HgPo that decomposes at ~300 °C and the lanthanide polonides, which do not decompose but melt at temperatures above 1000 °C. For example, the polonide of praseodymium (PrPo) melts at 1250 °C, and that of thulium (TmPo) melts at 2200 °C. PbPo is one of the very few naturally occurring polonium compounds, as polonium alpha decays to form lead.

Polonium hydride is a volatile liquid at room temperature prone to dissociation; it is thermally unstable. Water is the only other known hydrogen chalcogenide which is a liquid at room temperature; however, this is due to hydrogen bonding. The three oxides, PoO, PoO2 and PoO3, are the products of oxidation of polonium.

Halides of the structure PoX2, PoX4 and PoF6 are known. They are soluble in the corresponding hydrogen halides, i.e., PoClX in HCl, PoBrX in HBr and PoI4 in HI. Polonium dihalides are formed by direct reaction of the elements or by reduction of PoCl4 with SO2 and with PoBr4 with H2S at room temperature. Tetrahalides can be obtained by reacting polonium dioxide with HCl, HBr or HI.

Other polonium compounds include potassium polonite as a polonite, polonate, acetate, bromate, carbonate, citrate, chromate, cyanide, formate, (II) and (IV) hydroxides, nitrate, selenate, selenite, monosulfide, sulfate, disulfate and sulfite.

A limited organopolonium chemistry is known, mostly restricted to dialkyl and diaryl polonides (R2Po), triarylpolonium halides (Ar3PoX), and diarylpolonium dihalides (Ar2PoX2). Polonium also forms soluble compounds with some chelating agents, such as 2,3-butanediol and thiourea.

Oxides
 PoO
 PoO2
 PoO3

Hydrides
 PoH2

Halides
 PoX2 (except PoF2)
 PoX4
 PoF6
 PoBr2Cl2 (salmon pink)

Isotopes

Polonium has 42 known isotopes, all of which are radioactive. They have atomic masses that range from 186 to 227 u. 210Po (half-life 138.376 days) is the most widely available and is made via neutron capture by natural bismuth. The longer-lived 209Po (half-life  years, longest-lived of all polonium isotopes) and 208Po (half-life 2.9 years) can be made through the alpha, proton, or deuteron bombardment of lead or bismuth in a cyclotron.

History
Tentatively called "radium F", polonium was discovered by Marie and Pierre Curie in July 1898, and was named after Marie Curie's native land of Poland. Poland at the time was under Russian, German, and Austro-Hungarian partition, and did not exist as an independent country. It was Curie's hope that naming the element after her native land would publicize its lack of independence. Polonium may be the first element named to highlight a political controversy.

This element was the first one discovered by the Curies while they were investigating the cause of pitchblende radioactivity. Pitchblende, after removal of the radioactive elements uranium and thorium, was more radioactive than the uranium and thorium combined. This spurred the Curies to search for additional radioactive elements. They first separated out polonium from pitchblende in July 1898, and five months later, also isolated radium. German scientist Willy Marckwald successfully isolated 3 milligrams of polonium in 1902, though at the time he believed it was a new element, which he dubbed "radio-tellurium", and it was not until 1905 that it was demonstrated to be the same as polonium.

In the United States, polonium was produced as part of the Manhattan Project's Dayton Project during World War II. Polonium and beryllium were the key ingredients of the 'Urchin' initiator at the center of the bomb's spherical pit. 'Urchin' initiated the nuclear chain reaction at the moment of prompt-criticality to ensure that the weapon did not fizzle. 'Urchin' was used in early U.S. weapons; subsequent U.S. weapons utilized a pulse neutron generator for the same purpose.

Much of the basic physics of polonium was classified until after the war. The fact that it was used as an initiator was classified until the 1960s.

The Atomic Energy Commission and the Manhattan Project funded human experiments using polonium on five people at the University of Rochester between 1943 and 1947.

Occurrence and production
Polonium is a very rare element in nature because of the short half-lives of all its isotopes. Seven isotopes occur in traces as decay products: 210Po, 214Po, and 218Po occur in the decay chain of 238U; 211Po and 215Po occur in the decay chain of 235U; 212Po and 216Po occur in the decay chain of 232Th. Of these, 210Po is the only isotope with a half-life longer than 3 minutes.

Polonium can be found in uranium ores at about 0.1 mg per metric ton (1 part in 1010), which is approximately 0.2% of the abundance of radium. The amounts in the Earth's crust are not harmful. Polonium has been found in tobacco smoke from tobacco leaves grown with phosphate fertilizers.

Because it is present in small concentrations, isolation of polonium from natural sources is a tedious process. The largest batch of the element ever extracted, performed in the first half of the 20th century, contained only  (9 mg) of polonium-210 and was obtained by processing 37 tonnes of residues from radium production. Polonium is now usually obtained by irradiating bismuth with high-energy neutrons or protons.

In 1934, an experiment showed that when natural 209Bi is bombarded with neutrons, 210Bi is created, which then decays to 210Po via beta-minus decay. The final purification is done pyrochemically followed by liquid-liquid extraction techniques. Polonium may now be made in milligram amounts in this procedure which uses high neutron fluxes found in nuclear reactors. Only about 100 grams are produced each year, practically all of it in Russia, making polonium exceedingly rare.

This process can cause problems in lead-bismuth based liquid metal cooled nuclear reactors such as those used in the Soviet Navy's K-27. Measures must be taken in these reactors to deal with the unwanted possibility of 210Po being released from the coolant.

The longer-lived isotopes of polonium, 208Po and 209Po, can be formed by proton or deuteron bombardment of bismuth using a cyclotron. Other more neutron-deficient and more unstable isotopes can be formed by the irradiation of platinum with carbon nuclei.

Applications
Polonium-based sources of alpha particles were produced in the former Soviet Union. Such sources were applied for measuring the thickness of industrial coatings via attenuation of alpha radiation.

Because of intense alpha radiation, a one-gram sample of 210Po will spontaneously heat up to above  generating about 140 watts of power. Therefore, 210Po is used as an atomic heat source to power radioisotope thermoelectric generators via thermoelectric materials. For example, 210Po heat sources were used in the Lunokhod 1 (1970) and Lunokhod 2 (1973) Moon rovers to keep their internal components warm during the lunar nights, as well as the Kosmos 84 and 90 satellites (1965).

The alpha particles emitted by polonium can be converted to neutrons using beryllium oxide, at a rate of 93 neutrons per million alpha particles. Po-BeO mixtures are used as passive neutron sources with a gamma-ray-to-neutron production ratio of 1.13 ± 0.05, lower than for nuclear fission-based neutron sources. Examples of Po-BeO mixtures or alloys used as neutron sources are a neutron trigger or initiator for nuclear weapons and for inspections of oil wells.

Polonium was also part of brushes or more complex tools that eliminate static charges in photographic plates, textile mills, paper rolls, sheet plastics, and on substrates (such as automotive) prior to the application of coatings. Alpha particles emitted by polonium ionize air molecules that neutralize charges on the nearby surfaces. Polonium needs to be replaced in these devices nearly every year because of its short half-life; it is also highly radioactive and therefore has been mostly replaced by less dangerous beta particle sources.

Small amounts of 210Po are manufactured for sale to the public in the United States as "needle sources" for laboratory experimentation, and they are retailed by scientific supply companies. The polonium is a layer of plating which in turn is plated with a material such as gold, which allows the alpha radiation (used in experiments such as cloud chambers) to pass while preventing the polonium from being released and presenting a toxic hazard.

Polonium spark plugs were marketed by Firestone from 1940 to 1953. While the amount of radiation from the plugs was minuscule and not a threat to the consumer, the benefits of such plugs quickly diminished after approximately a month because of polonium's short half-life and because buildup on the conductors would block the radiation that improved engine performance. (The premise behind the polonium spark plug, as well as Alfred Matthew Hubbard's prototype radium plug that preceded it, was that the radiation would improve ionization of the fuel in the cylinder and thus allow the motor to fire more quickly and efficiently.)

Biology and toxicity

Overview
Polonium can be hazardous and has no biological role. The main hazard is its intense radioactivity (as an alpha emitter), which makes it difficult to handle safely. Even in microgram amounts, handling 210Po is extremely dangerous, requiring specialized equipment (a negative pressure alpha glove box equipped with high-performance filters), adequate monitoring, and strict handling procedures to avoid any contamination. Alpha particles emitted by polonium will damage organic tissue easily if polonium is ingested, inhaled, or absorbed, although they do not penetrate the epidermis and hence are not hazardous as long as the alpha particles remain outside the body. Wearing chemically resistant and intact gloves is a mandatory precaution to avoid transcutaneous diffusion of polonium directly through the skin. Polonium delivered in concentrated nitric acid can easily diffuse through inadequate gloves (e.g., latex gloves) or the acid may damage the gloves.

Polonium does not have toxic chemical properties.

It has been reported that some microbes can methylate polonium by the action of methylcobalamin. This is similar to the way in which mercury, selenium, and tellurium are methylated in living things to create organometallic compounds. Studies investigating the metabolism of polonium-210 in rats have shown that only 0.002 to 0.009% of polonium-210 ingested is excreted as volatile polonium-210.

Acute effects
The median lethal dose (LD50) for acute radiation exposure is about 4.5 Sv. The committed effective dose equivalent 210Po is 0.51 µSv/Bq if ingested, and 2.5 µSv/Bq if inhaled. A fatal 4.5 Sv dose can be caused by ingesting , about 50 nanograms (ng), or inhaling , about 10 ng. One gram of 210Po could thus in theory poison 20 million people, of whom 10 million would die. The actual toxicity of 210Po is lower than these estimates because radiation exposure that is spread out over several weeks (the biological half-life of polonium in humans is 30 to 50 days) is somewhat less damaging than an instantaneous dose. For comparison, one grain of table salt is about 0.06 mg = 60 μg.

Long term (chronic) effects
In addition to the acute effects, radiation exposure (both internal and external) carries a long-term risk of death from cancer of 5–10% per Sv. The general population is exposed to small amounts of polonium as a radon daughter in indoor air; the isotopes 214Po and 218Po are thought to cause the majority of the estimated 15,000–22,000 lung cancer deaths in the US every year that have been attributed to indoor radon. Tobacco smoking causes additional exposure to polonium.

Regulatory exposure limits and handling
The maximum allowable body burden for ingested 210Po is only , which is equivalent to a particle massing only 6.8 picograms. The maximum permissible workplace concentration of airborne 210Po is about 10 Bq/m3 ( µCi/cm3). The target organs for polonium in humans are the spleen and liver. As the spleen (150 g) and the liver (1.3 to 3 kg) are much smaller than the rest of the body, if the polonium is concentrated in these vital organs, it is a greater threat to life than the dose which would be suffered (on average) by the whole body if it were spread evenly throughout the body, in the same way as caesium or tritium (as T2O).

210Po is widely used in industry, and readily available with little regulation or restriction. The IAEA "is said to be considering tighter regulations ... As of 2013, this is still the only alpha emitting byproduct material available, as a NRC Exempt Quantity, which may be held without a radioactive material license.

Polonium and its compounds must be handled in a glove box, which is further enclosed in another box, maintained at a slightly higher pressure than the glove box to prevent the radioactive materials from leaking out. Gloves made of natural rubber do not provide sufficient protection against the radiation from polonium; surgical gloves are necessary. Neoprene gloves shield radiation from polonium better than natural rubber.

Cases of poisoning
Despite the element's highly hazardous properties, circumstances in which polonium poisoning can occur are rare. Its extreme scarcity in nature, the short half-lives of all its isotopes, the specialised facilities and equipment needed to obtain any significant quantity, and safety precautions against laboratory accidents all make harmful exposure events unlikely. As such, only a handful of cases of radiation poisoning specifically attributable to polonium exposure have been confirmed.

20th century
In response to concerns about the risks of occupational polonium exposure, quantities of 210Po were administered to five human volunteers at the University of Rochester from 1944 to 1947, in order to study its biological behaviour. These studies were funded by the Manhattan Project and the AEC. Four men and a woman participated, all suffering from terminal cancers, and ranged in age from their early thirties to early forties; all were chosen because experimenters wanted subjects who had not been exposed to polonium either through work or accident. 210Po was injected into four hospitalised patients, and orally given to a fifth. None of the administered doses (all ranging from 0.17 to 0.30 μCi kg−1) approached fatal quantities.

The first documented death directly resulting from polonium poisoning occurred in the Soviet Union, on 10 July 1954. An unidentified 41-year-old man presented for medical treatment on 29 June, with severe vomiting and fever; the previous day, he had been working for five hours in an area in which, unknown to him, a capsule containing 210Po had depressurised and begun to disperse in aerosol form. Over this period, his total intake of airborne 210Po was estimated at 0.11 GBq (almost 25 times the estimated LD50 by inhalation of 4.5 MBq). Despite treatment, his condition continued to worsen and he died 13 days after the exposure event.

It has also been suggested that Irène Joliot-Curie's 1956 death from leukaemia was owed to the radiation effects of polonium. She was accidentally exposed in 1946 when a sealed capsule of the element exploded on her laboratory bench.

As well, several deaths in Israel during 1957–1969 have been alleged to have resulted from 210Po exposure. A leak was discovered at a Weizmann Institute laboratory in 1957. Traces of 210Po were found on the hands of Professor Dror Sadeh, a physicist who researched radioactive materials. Medical tests indicated no harm, but the tests did not include bone marrow. Sadeh, one of his students, and two colleagues died from various cancers over the subsequent few years. The issue was investigated secretly, but there was never any formal admission of a connection between the leak and the deaths.

21st century

The cause of the 2006 death of Alexander Litvinenko, a former Russian FSB agent who had defected to the United Kingdom in 2001, was identified to be poisoning with a lethal dose of 210Po; it was subsequently determined that the 210Po had probably been deliberately administered to him by two Russian ex-security agents, Andrey Lugovoy and Dmitry Kovtun. As such, Litvinenko's death was the first (and, to date, only) confirmed instance in which polonium's extreme toxicity has been used with malicious intent.

In 2011, an allegation surfaced that the death of Palestinian leader Yasser Arafat, who died on 11 November 2004 of uncertain causes, also resulted from deliberate polonium poisoning, and in July 2012, abnormally high concentrations of 210Po were detected in Arafat's clothes and personal belongings by the Institut de Radiophysique in Lausanne, Switzerland. However, the Institut's spokesman stressed that despite these tests, Arafat's medical reports were not consistent with 210Po poisoning, and science journalist Deborah Blum suggested that tobacco smoke might rather have been responsible, as both Arafat and many of his colleagues were heavy smokers; subsequent tests by both French and Russian teams determined that the elevated 210Po levels were not the result of deliberate poisoning, and did not cause Arafat's death.

There is also a suspicion of poisoning Roman Tsepov with polonium. He had symptoms similar to Aleksander Litvinenko.

Treatment
It has been suggested that chelation agents, such as British Anti-Lewisite (dimercaprol), can be used to decontaminate humans. In one experiment, rats were given a fatal dose of 1.45 MBq/kg (8.7 ng/kg) of 210Po;
all untreated rats were dead after 44 days, but 90% of the rats treated with the chelation agent
HOEtTTC remained alive for 5 months.

Detection in biological specimens
Polonium-210 may be quantified in biological specimens by alpha particle spectrometry to confirm a diagnosis of poisoning in hospitalized patients or to provide evidence in a medicolegal death investigation. The baseline urinary excretion of polonium-210 in healthy persons due to routine exposure to environmental sources is normally in a range of 5–15 mBq/day. Levels in excess of 30 mBq/day are suggestive of excessive exposure to the radionuclide.

Occurrence in humans and the biosphere
Polonium-210 is widespread in the biosphere, including in human tissues, because of its position in the uranium-238 decay chain. Natural uranium-238 in the Earth's crust decays through a series of solid radioactive intermediates including radium-226 to the radioactive noble gas radon-222, some of which, during its 3.8-day half-life, diffuses into the atmosphere. There it decays through several more steps to polonium-210, much of which, during its 138-day half-life, is washed back down to the Earth's surface, thus entering the biosphere, before finally decaying to stable lead-206.

As early as the 1920s, French biologist , using polonium provided by his colleague Marie Curie, showed that the element has a specific pattern of uptake in rabbit tissues, with high concentrations, particularly in liver, kidney, and testes. More recent evidence suggests that this behavior results from polonium substituting for its congener sulfur, also in group 16 of the periodic table, in sulfur-containing amino-acids or related molecules and that similar patterns of distribution occur in human tissues. Polonium is indeed an element naturally present in all humans, contributing appreciably to natural background dose, with wide geographical and cultural variations, and particularly high levels in arctic residents, for example.

Tobacco
Polonium-210 in tobacco contributes to many of the cases of lung cancer worldwide. Most of this polonium is derived from lead-210 deposited on tobacco leaves from the atmosphere; the lead-210 is a product of radon-222 gas, much of which appears to originate from the decay of radium-226 from fertilizers applied to the tobacco soils.

The presence of polonium in tobacco smoke has been known since the early 1960s. Some of the world's biggest tobacco firms researched ways to remove the substance—to no avail—over a 40-year period. The results were never published.

Food
Polonium is found in the food chain, especially in seafood.

See also
 Polonium halo
 Poisoning of Alexander Litvinenko

References

Bibliography

External links

 Polonium at The Periodic Table of Videos (University of Nottingham)

 
Chemical elements
Chalcogens
Post-transition metals
Element toxicology
IARC Group 1 carcinogens
Science and technology in Poland
Marie Curie
Pierre Curie
Chemical elements predicted by Dmitri Mendeleev